Nicholas Duncan-Williams is a Ghanaian charismatic pioneer, the presiding archbishop and general overseer of the Action Chapel International (ACI) ministry, headquartered in Accra, Ghana. He is the founder of the Charismatic Movement which started 20 years ago in Ghana and other parts of West Africa. CAFM, one church in many locations, has over 2000 affiliate and 250 branch churches located in North America, Europe, and Africa. He was the first non-American to lead the prayer for the United States President-elect and Vice-President-elect ahead of the inauguration.

Career 
Duncan-Williams is the Founder and President of Prayer Summit International (PSI). In 2017, Duncan-Williams was named by the New African Magazine one of “The 100 Most Influential Africans". He became the first non-American to lead the prayer for the incoming President and Vice President of the United States during the inauguration. The Archbishop and his wife Lady Rosa Whitaker of The Whitaker Group have been named one of Africa's power couples.,”

Dominion University, 
Duncan-Williams is the Founder of Dominion University, based in Ghana, which aims to train a new generation in excellence and ethical leadership for ministry, government, and business.

Publications

Books self published by Duncan-Williams include:

See also

Benson Idahosa
Charismatic Movement

References

Sources

1957 births
Living people
Christian writers
Ghanaian Christians
Ghanaian expatriates in Nigeria